NGC 2004 (also known as ESO 86-SC4) is an open cluster of stars in the southern constellation of Dorado. It was discovered by Scottish astronomer James Dunlop on September 24, 1826. This is a young, massive cluster with an age of about 20 million years and 23,000 times the mass of the Sun. NGC 2004 is a member of the Large Magellanic Cloud, which is a satellite galaxy of the Milky Way.

References

External links
 

Open clusters
2004
ESO objects
Dorado (constellation)
Large Magellanic Cloud
Astronomical objects discovered in 1826
Discoveries by James Dunlop